Wood is the twenty-first album by the Athens, Georgia-based band Widespread Panic. It is their tenth official live album release. It was released on the band's Widespread Records imprint on October 16, 2012.  Initially released on 2-CD, 2-LP and digitally, it features material recorded from the band's 20th anniversary Wood Tour in 2012. This is also the last album featuring Todd Nance on drums. 

Another release, Live Wood was also culled from the 2012 Wood Tour and was released on Record Store Day, April 21, 2012.

Track listing

Disc 1
"The Ballad of John and Yoko" (John Lennon, Paul McCartney) 	4:12 	
"Mercy" (Widespread Panic) 	7:31 	
"Imitation Leather Shoes" (Widespread Panic) 	5:43 	
"Clinic Cynic" (Widespread Panic)	4:46 	
"Tall Boy" (Widespread Panic)	7:04 	
"Many Rivers to Cross" (James E. Chambers)	4:53 	
"Good Morning Little School Girl" (Sonny Boy Williamson I)	8:42 	
"Pickin' Up the Pieces" (Widespread Panic)	6:19 	
"Ain't Life Grand" (Widespread Panic)	4:41

Disc 2
"St. Louis" (Widespread Panic)	4:24 	
"Time Waits" (Widespread Panic)	3:44 	
"Sell Sell" (Alan Price)	5:23 	
"Tail Dragger" (Willie Dixon)	5:19 	
"Tickle the Truth" (Widespread Panic) 	5:32 	
"Fixin' to Die" (Bukka White) 6:44 	
"Climb to Safety" (Jerry Joseph, Glen Esparanza)	6:11 	
"Counting Train Cars" (Widespread Panic)	3:32 	
"C Brown" (Widespread Panic)	5:57 	
"Blight" (Vic Chesnutt, Michael Houser, Todd Nance, David A. Schools)	4:59 	
"End of the Show" (Daniel Hutchens) 	4:58  * CD Only bonus track

Personnel
 John Bell - Guitar (Acoustic), Guitar (Resonator), Vocals 
 Jimmy Herring - Guitar (Acoustic)
 Todd Nance - Drums, Vocals 
 Domingo S. Ortiz - Percussion
 Dave Schools - Bass (Acoustic), Vocals 
 John Hermann - Harmonium, Melodica, Piano, Pump Organ, Toy Piano, Vocals
 Col. Bruce Hampton - Vocals

References

External links
Widespread Panic website
Everyday Companion

2012 live albums
Widespread Panic live albums